Centaurea pullata is a species of Centaurea found in Southwest Europe and Northwest Africa.

References

External links

pullata
Flora of Southwestern Europe
Flora of North Africa